Econfina River State Park is a Florida State Park, covering 3,377 acres (14 km2) located on the Gulf of Mexico at the mouth of the Econfina River. The address is 4384 Econfina River Road, Lamont, Florida, United States.

Ecology
The park contains 5,000 acres pine flatwoods, oak/palm forests, and broad expanses of salt marsh dotted with pine islands.

Recreational Activities
The park has such amenities as birding, boating, canoeing, fishing, hiking, horse trails, kayaking and picnicking areas. Concessions are also available.

Admission and Hours
There is a small entrance charge. Florida state parks are open between 8 a.m. and sundown every day of the year (including holidays).

Gallery

External links
 Econfina River State Park at Florida State Parks

State parks of Florida
Parks in Taylor County, Florida